Now Deh (also known as Deh Now) is a village in Gerit Rural District, Papi District, Khorramabad County, Lorestan Province, Iran. At the 2006 census, its population was 75, in 14 families.

References 

Towns and villages in Khorramabad County